Colonel John Skinner "Belge" Wilson (1888–1969) was a Scottish scouting luminary and friend and contemporary of General Baden-Powell, recruited by him to head the International Bureau, later to become the World Bureau of the World Organization of the Scout Movement. Wilson was acting director from 1938 to 1939 following the death of Hubert S. Martin; he was elected in 1939 and remained in office until 1951. He then became Honorary President of WOSM for four years.

Scouting
Baden-Powell visited India in 1921, where he met and recruited Colonel Wilson, who was then Senior Deputy Commissioner of Police in Calcutta, and in his free time was serving as Calcutta's District Scout Commissioner.

Wilson ran Gilwell Park for The Scout Association in the early 1920s. He served as Director of the Boy Scouts International Bureau for 15 years, tasked with co-ordinating various Scout movements within countries and between them prior to the establishment of World Scout Regions. After retirement, he served as Honorary President of the Boy Scouts International Committee for a further four years.

To encourage the creation of Rovering in the Boy Scouts of America, the first Wood Badge course held in the United States was a Rover Scout Wood Badge course, directed by Wilson.

Wilson introduced an international Scout badge in 1939-a silver fleur-de-lis or arrowhead badge on a purple background surrounded by the names of the five continents in silver within a circular frame. The wearing of it was not universal, but was confined to past and present members of the International Committee and staff of the Bureau. A flag of similar design followed, the flying of which was restricted to international Scout gatherings.

Wilson was awarded the Bronze Wolf, the only distinction of the World Organization of the Scout Movement, awarded by the World Scout Committee for exceptional services to world Scouting, in 1937. In 1952 he also received the highest distinction of the Scout Association of Japan, the Golden Pheasant Award. During a visit in Austria in 1957 he was awarded with one of the highest honours of Austrian Scouting the Silbernen Steinbock Silver Capricorn (on red-white-red ribbon).

Wilson took a six-year world tour reviewing the world's Scout organisations, culminating in a five-month tour of Asia in October 1952. Upon the 50th anniversary of World Scouting in 1957, Colonel Wilson took his research notes gathered on the trip and authored the publication of the first edition of the seminal work on world Scouting, Scouting Round the World.

Military
Wilson, a colonel, became known for heading the Scandinavian branch of the Special Operations Executive during World War II. He was also involved in the Anglo-Norwegian Collaboration Committee, and for his work he was proclaimed Commander of the Royal Norwegian Order of St. Olav.

Further reading

References

1888 births
1969 deaths
Recipients of the Bronze Wolf Award
The Scout Association
Scottish police officers
International Scouting leaders
Scouting pioneers
British police officers in India
British Army personnel of World War II
Scouting and Guiding in India
19th-century Scottish people
20th-century Scottish people
British people in colonial India